The 2009 FIA WTCC Race of Germany was the ninth round of the 2009 World Touring Car Championship season, and the fifth running of the FIA WTCC Race of Germany. It was held on 6 September 2009 at the Motorsport Arena Oschersleben near Oschersleben, near Magdeburg in Germany. The races were won by BMW drivers Andy Priaulx and Augusto Farfus.

Background
SEAT Sport driver Yvan Muller arrived at Oschersleben after a seven-week break with a five-point lead over teammate Gabriele Tarquini, with Augusto Farfus a further point behind.

A field of 27 cars made the trip to Oschersleben. Making their World Touring Car Championship debuts in Germany were reigning European Touring Car Cup champion Michel Nykjær for Perfection Racing in a Chevrolet Lacetti, and fellow Danish Touring Car Championship frontrunner Jason Watt in a privately run SEAT León. Driving the SUNRED Engineering guest car for SEAT León Eurocup drivers was Jean-Marie Clairet. Meanwhile, James Thompson missed the event as he prepared for the Phillip Island 500K V8 Supercar race. This meant that regular Lada Sport drivers Jaap van Lagen and Kirill Ladygin were driving the new Priora model for the first time along with team principal Viktor Shapovalov, who returned to driving duties.

Report

Free Practice
The first free practice session took place on a damp track between 08:45 and 09:15 local time on Saturday 5, with BMW Team Germany's Augusto Farfus quickest with a time of 1:50.841. Chevrolet's Rob Huff was second ahead of SEAT Sport's Tiago Monteiro.

The second free practice session took place between 11:00 and 11:30 local time on a drying track, with Farfus quickest again with a time of 1:36.760. His teammate Jörg Müller was second, with Yvan Muller third for SEAT.

Qualifying
Qualifying began at 15:15 local time, and with rain falling after less than five minutes into the opening session. This meant that the top 10 drivers for the second session were effectively decided in the first two flying laps. Gabriele Tarquini was fastest and amongst those who joined him were Lada Sport driver Jaap van Lagen and independents Tom Coronel and Marin Čolak. Andy Priaulx and Yvan Muller were only 15th and 17th fastest.

Qualifying 2 began at 15:40. Augusto Farfus and Jörg Müller were initially quickest on wet tyres, but as the track dried those who gambled on slick tyres went much faster. Tarquini took the pole for SEAT with a time of 1:39.866. Čolak was second fastest, at his first event since the Czech Republic race. Rickard Rydell qualified third, ahead of the Lada of van Lagen, the first time he has driven the new Priora model.

Rob Huff and Kristian Poulsen were both given 10 place grid penalties. Huff was demoted from 6th to 16th after an engine change in his Chevrolet Cruze after Sunday morning warm up. Poulsen started from the back after ignoring yellow flag rules in Saturday's practice sessions.

Warm Up
Andy Priaulx was fastest in Sunday morning warm up, ahead of BMW teammates Jörg Müller and Augusto Farfus. The top three were separated by just 0.088 seconds. They were followed by the five SEAT Sport drivers.

Race One
Race one began shortly before 13:00 local time. At the first chicane Jörg Müller was spun round and hit by BMW Team Germany teammate Augusto Farfus, with Rob Huff and Jordi Gené also involved. Andy Priaulx moved from 14th to 4th during the first lap. He then passed Tom Coronel and Rickard Rydell before passing polesitter Gabriele Tarquini for the lead. From there he controlled the race, setting the fastest lap on his way to the win.

Behind Tarquni, Rydell and Independent class winner Coronel who finished second, third and fourth respectively, the main battle was for fifth. Lada Sport driver Jaap van Lagen was due to score the team's first points in fifth, having held off pressure from a convoy of Nicola Larini, Farfus and Stefano D'Aste. However, at the last corner van Lagen was hit from behind by the Chevrolet of Larini, sending the Lada into the gravel. Larini took fifth, narrowly ahead of Farfus at the line, while van Lagen could only rejoin and finish 11th. D'Aste scored his first points of the season in seventh, while fellow independent BMW driver Franz Engstler was set to start race two on pole position after finishing in eighth.

Tarquini took the lead of the championship after SEAT Sport teammate Yvan Muller broke his right front wheel and suspension after clipping the tyre stack on the inside of the first chicane having been passed for tenth by Farfus.

Larini was later given a 30-second penalty for the clash with van Lagen, which demoted him from fifth to fifteenth.

Race Two
Race two began at 15:08 local time. Front-row starting independents Engstler and D'Aste led Farfus for the first lap, but Farfus passed D'Aste for second at the start of the second lap before passing Engstler three laps later. Farfus remained in the lead until the finish. He was followed home by fellow BMW driver Priaulx, who had made up three places on the opening lap and passed Larini, D'Aste and Engstler to secure second place, scoring the fastest lap once again. A drive-through penalty for D'Aste and a mechanical failure for Engstler allowed Tarquini to score his second podium finish of the day, which means he left Germany leading the standings.

Jörg Müller and Sergio Hernández made their way up from further back on the grid to finish fourth and fifth ahead of Larini in sixth. Yvan Muller made his way up to seventh from a grid position of 21st. Coronel benefitted from the misfortunes of D'Aste and Engstler to take the independent class victory in eighth, with the Chevrolets of Rob Huff and Alain Menu rounding out the top 10.

Results

Qualifying

Race 1

Bold denotes Fastest lap.
 † Larini had originally finished 5th but was given a 30-second penalty for causing a collision with van Lagen and dropped to 15th.

Race 2

Bold denotes Fastest lap.

Standings after the race

Drivers' Championship standings

Yokohama Independents' Trophy standings

Manufacturers' Championship standings

 Note: Only the top five positions are included for both sets of drivers' standings.

References

External links 
Results Booklet PDF at MST Systems

Race of Germany
Germany